The McGovern Institute for Brain Research is a research institute within MIT. Its mission is to understand how the brain works and to discover new ways to prevent or treat brain disorders.   The institute was founded in 2000 by Patrick McGovern and Lore Harp McGovern with a gift to MIT that is expected to total $350M over 20 years.

Role
The McGovern Institute conducts research into all aspects of brain function, including perception, cognition and action. It also conducts clinical and translational research on a wide range of brain disorders.

The institute's core facilities include the Martinos Imaging Center, which provides neuroimaging technologies for human and animal research, including MRI, EEG and MEG.

The McGovern Institute occupies approximately 85,000 sq ft (net) within the MIT Brain and Cognitive Sciences Complex.  This building, which was completed in 2005, also houses the Picower Institute for Learning and Memory and the Department of Brain and Cognitive Sciences, and is among the largest neuroscience research buildings in the world.  The building was designed by Indian architect Charles Correa in collaboration with the Boston-based firm Goody, Clancy & Associates, Inc.  It is one of the most distinctive landmarks on the MIT campus, notable especially for the Grand Junction railroad that runs through the center of the building.

Faculty
Robert Desimone is the current director of the McGovern Institute and the Doris and Don Berkey Professor in the Department of Brain and Cognitive Sciences. Prior to joining the McGovern Institute in 2004, he was director of the Intramural Research Program at the National Institute for Mental Health, the largest mental health research center in the world. The 24 current faculty members include a Nobel laureate (H. Robert Horvitz), a winner of the US National Medal of Science (Ann Graybiel), Ila Fiete and seven members of the US National Academy of Sciences (Desimone, Horvitz, Graybiel, Boyden, and Feng Zhang, along with Emilio Bizzi and Nancy Kanwisher). The founding director (2000-2004) was Phillip Sharp, also a Nobel Laureate.

Public art

SCIENTIA

SCIENTIA by Ursula von Rydingsvard is a sculpture permanently put on display in front of the McGovern Institute. It is MIT's 52nd piece of public art. The sculpture was commissioned by Lore Harp McGovern, co-founder of the McGovern Institute.

It was constructed out of bronze using sand casting and lost-wax casting.

Schwerpunkt
Schwerpunkt (German for "Center of mass or gravity") is a sculpture by Ralph Helmick. The sculpture consists of one hundred 3D printed metal neurons suspended above the McGovern Institute lobby. When viewed from a specific focal point on the building's third floor atrium, the neurons take on the shape of a human brain.

References

External links

Athinoula A. Martinos Imaging Center at McGovern Institute
 Views of MIT Brain and Cognitive Sciences Complex on Goody Clancy web site

Massachusetts Institute of Technology
Cognitive science research institutes
Neuroscience research centers in the United States
Research institutes in Massachusetts